The 1976 Ole Miss Rebels football team represented the University of Mississippi (Ole Miss) in the 1976 NCAA Division I football season. The Rebels were led by third-year head coach Ken Cooper and played their home games at Hemingway Stadium in Oxford, Mississippi and Mississippi Veterans Memorial Stadium in Jackson. The team competed as members of the Southeastern Conference, finishing in sixth. Highlights of the season included upset victories over top-ten ranked teams Alabama and Georgia.

Schedule

Roster
QB Bobby Garner
TE Ray Poole Jr.

References

Ole Miss
Ole Miss Rebels football seasons
Ole Miss Rebels football